Alias Jimmy Valentine is a 1928 American crime drama film directed by Jack Conway and starring William Haines, Leila Hyams, Lionel Barrymore, and Karl Dane. The film is based on the 1903 O. Henry story "A Retrieved Reformation", which was turned into the 1910 play Alias Jimmy Valentine by Paul Armstrong. The play toured in travelling production companies making it extremely popular. It was revived on Broadway in 1921. Two previous film adaptations had been produced at the old Metro Studios. A 1915 film version was directed by Maurice Tourneur and a 1920 version starring Bert Lytell was directed by Edmund Mortimer and Arthur Ripley.

Released on November 15, 1928, the film was Metro-Goldwyn-Mayer's first partially talking film. It was completed as a silent film before Irving Thalberg sent back Lionel Barrymore and William Haines to repeat their performances for the last two reels with sound.

The film was shot in the middle of the night to avoid ambient noise infiltrating the soundtrack. Haines described the discomfort of working with sound: "You are confined to working quarters... that are almost airtight. You can hardly breathe, and in the hot weather it's like working in a boiler room... The sweat rolled off me until I could hardly stand it, and once I nearly felt like fainting".

Plot
Jimmy Valentine is the alias of an infamous safe cracker who has just been sentenced to prison for four years for his crimes. He does not stay locked up for long, though, as he is released after ten months. When he is released, he packs his state of the art, custom robbery tools and commits several more robberies. Ben Price, the detective who put him away the first time is called to the case, but although he knows it is Jimmy (because of the style the crimes were committed with) he cannot find him. Jimmy has actually fled and he is currently in the small town of Elmore, Arkansas, with plans to rob the local bank there.

However, he finds himself love-struck by the banker's beautiful daughter, Annabel Adams, and begins to fall in love with her. In order to get such a beautiful girl, he decides to turn over a new leaf and give up his criminal career and take another alias, Ralph D. Spencer. "Ralph" opens a shoe-making store and is very successful in doing so. He even begins to like his new life, and easily wins Annabel's heart, becoming engaged to her. He writes a letter to an old friend, and tells him to meet him in Little Rock, where he will give him the robbery tools he doesn't want anymore. On the day of the exchange, however, the banker shows the town his new safe, that cannot be broken into. Annabel's nieces are amazed at the sheer size of it and begin to walk in and out of it.

One accidentally shuts the door, locking the other inside. Everyone panics, as the banker has not set the combination yet, and Annabel begs "Ralph" to do something. This is hard for Valentine, as Ben Price has also tracked him down, and watches to see his decision. As Jimmy has tried so hard to start over, he finds himself making a very difficult decision. However, he decides that there is only so much air in the safe, and if he does not take action, the terrified child may suffocate. Valentine pulls out his bag of tools and breaks the safe open in a matter of minutes, surprising the people "Ralph" was with, and saving the child. He ironically broke his own record in his haste. Jimmy knows that since he has revealed his identity, he must leave. As he is leaving, he decides that he may as well go to prison and he surrenders to Ben. However, Ben, who knows that Valentine has truly changed, tells Jimmy he should go to Little Rock, and leaves, pretending that he never met him.

Cast
 William Haines as Jimmy Valentine
 Lionel Barrymore as Doyle
 Leila Hyams as Rose
 Karl Dane as Swedeas
 Tully Marshall as Avery
 Howard C. Hickman as Mr. Lane
 Billy Butts as Bobby
 Evelyn Mills as Little Sister
 Dolores Brinkman as Chorus girl
 Johnny Hines as Bit part

Preservation status 
The full film is now considered lost, but a silent French 9.5mm abridgement, which condenses the film's original ten-reels to four, exists in a private collection. Parts of the soundtrack survive on Vitaphone disks.

See also
 List of lost films
 Lionel Barrymore filmography
 Alias Jimmy Valentine (radio program)

References
Explanatory notes

Citations

External links
 Surviving Vitaphone soundtrack disks reels 6, 7 & 9 at SoundCloud
 
 
 
program cover to the film from 1929 (*if pages does not load click on the worthpoint link, then return and click)
surviving lobby card

1928 films
1928 crime drama films
American crime drama films
American black-and-white films
American detective films
1920s English-language films
American films based on plays
Films based on short fiction
Films directed by Jack Conway
Lost American films
Metro-Goldwyn-Mayer films
Transitional sound drama films
Adaptations of works by O. Henry
1928 lost films
Lost crime drama films
1920s American films